Andy Parsons (born 15 May 1981) is a former professional English darts player who plays in Professional Darts Corporation events.

He earned a PDC Tour Card in 2014 and 2017, and qualified for the 2013 UK Open, but lost in the second round.

References

External links
Profile and stats on Darts Database

1981 births
Living people
English darts players
Professional Darts Corporation former tour card holders
Sportspeople from Bristol